100% Kelly Key is a compilation album by Brazilian pop singer Kelly Key, released on December 10, 2007, by Som Livre.

Track listing

References

2007 compilation albums
Kelly Key compilation albums
Portuguese-language compilation albums
Som Livre compilation albums